Sailing/Yachting is an Olympic sport starting from the Games of the 1st Olympiad (1896 Olympics in Athens Greece). With the exception of 1904 and the canceled 1916 Summer Olympics, sailing has always been included on the Olympic schedule. The Sailing program of 1932 consisted of a total of four sailing classes (disciplines). For each class races were scheduled from 5–12 August directly off the Los Angeles Harbor on the Pacific Ocean.

Venue 
Source:

Los Angeles Harbor

Sea breeze 
Due to the predicted Sea breeze in Los Angeles Harbor it was decided to race the Snowbirds in the lighter morning breezes. However, during the mornings there was virtually no wind at all. Therefore, some races of the Snowbird were sailed in the afternoon in heavy conditions. Luckily no capsizing took place. It also gave issues for those sailors who were competing not only in the Snowbird but also in one of the other classes.

Course areas 
The courses had been well prepared. The marks were laid by the United States Lighthouse Service in the form of large Government buoys, and kelp beds under the lee of Point Fermin were marked by the United States Navy Department as restricted area. Visiting yachts were kept at a safe distance from the racing boats by the US Coast Guard. Tows were arranged by the US Navy to and from Los Angeles Harbor to the race area's. On the Pacific side of the San Pedro Breakwater the Star, 6 Metre and 8 Metre yachts had their races. Those classes had to pass the Angels Gate light in order to reach the course area. The Snowbird stayed inside the breakwater to protect them from the ocean swell.

Competition 
Source:

Overview 

 However all events were gender independent it turned out to be a male only event.

Continents

Countries 

 This time no new countries participated in the Sailing event of this Olympic.

Classes (equipment)

Race schedule
Source:

Medal summary 
Source:

Medal table 
Source:

Notes

Star 
The 1932 Olympics featured for the first time the Star as Olympic discipline. This turned out to be so far the longest run for a sailing discipline in the Olympics. The Star was an Olympic class from 1932 - 2012 with the exception of 1976.

Snowbird 
The USOC proposed to discontinue the 12' Dinghy in favor of a small V-bottom Catboat locally known as the Snowbird as the single handed one design class. This proposal was carried by the IYRU and IOC. The locally available Snowbirds were equipped with new masts, sails and rigging.

Medical assistance 
For medical incidents during the Yachting events a United States Navy boat and a US Coast Guard boat were on duty during the races. This boats were equipped with an inhalator and crew furnished by the Los Angeles Fire Department.

Seven local physicians provided voluntary service (in alphabetical order):
 Edward G. Eisen, M.D., Head Physician
 Stanley Boller, M.D.
 J. Park Dougall, M.D.
 K. E. Kretzschmar, M.D.
 G. A. Laubersheimer, M.D.
 Wayland A. Morrison, M.D.
 Ewald Werner, M.D.

Other information

Sailors in multiple disciplines 
Three sailors attempted to sail in the Snownbird and the Star. This was a challenge since the schedule of the Snowbird was modified due to the light air weather conditions in the mornings of the regattas.

Sailing 
During the Sailing regattas at the 1932 Summer Olympics among others the following persons were competing in the various classes:
 , Jacques Lebrun, French boat designer and technical director of the French national association
 , Bob Maas, Dutch long time Star sailor
 , United States yachtsman and American industrialist Donald Wills Douglas, Jr. in the 6 Metre
 , United States yachting legend and inventor of the Swimfin, Owen Churchill in the 8 Metre

Further reading

References 

 
1932 Summer Olympics events
1932
1932 in sailing